Beyond the Quadra Zone (or BQZ) is a open-ended, science fiction, play-by-mail (PBM) game. It was published by Quest Games, Inc.

History and development
Beyond the Quadra Zone was a mid-complexity, open-ended, science fiction PBM game. One reviewer called it a "power game". Quest Games, Inc. published the game, which drew from the design of Universe II. It was computer moderated with some human assistance.

Gameplay
The game setting is outer space in the year 2615. As starship captains, players explored space and collected resources. Beyond the charted regions of space, the uncharted "quadra zone" was newly accessible for exploration. The elements of gameplay included combat.

Reception
A reviewer in the Summer–Fall 1984 issue of Gaming Universal rated the game "excellent" at four of five stars, stating "I recommend Beyond the Quadra Zone highly." In late 1984, David Webber, the editor of Paper Mayhem magazine reviewed the game, saying it "has quickly become one of my favorite PBM games".

See also
 List of play-by-mail games

References

Bibliography

 
 
 
 

Multiplayer games
Play-by-mail games
Science fiction games